Paulo is a  surname. Notable people with the surname include:

Oriol Paulo (born 1975), Spanish thriller film director and screenwriter
Ti'i Paulo (born 1983), Samoan rugby player
Pierre-Antoine Paulo (1944-2021), Haitian bishop
Helena Paulo (born 1998), Angolan handball player